The New England Classic was a golf tournament on the Nike Tour. It ran from 1990 to 1993. It was played at the Woodlands Country Club in Falmouth, Maine, with its last winner, John Morse, earning $27,000 in winnings in 1993.

Winners

Former Korn Ferry Tour events
Golf in Maine
Falmouth, Maine
Recurring sporting events established in 1990
Recurring sporting events disestablished in 1993
1990 establishments in Maine
1993 disestablishments in Maine